Oaklands Park is a public park in Chichester, West Sussex, England.

History 
In 1939, Chichester City Council purchased the 10 acres of land for the park for the sum of £11,000.

In 2006, a clubhouse for the Chichester Rifle and Pistol Club was constructed in the park.

In November 2011, a community orchard was planted.

In March 2021, a vigil was held in the park for Sarah Everard.

Leisure

Sports 
The park contains 4 rugby pitches, a football pitch, a softball pitch, a pavilion, and a cricket pitch.

Chichester City F.C. are based at the park.

Culture 
Chichester Festival Theatre is located in south end of the park

Gallery

References 

Urban public parks in the United Kingdom
Chichester